Yakov Permyakov (died 1712) was a Russian seafarer, explorer, merchant, and Cossack.

In 1710, while sailing from the Lena River to the Kolyma River, Permyakov observed the silhouette of two unknown island groups in the sea. Those islands would later be called Bolshoy Lyakhovsky and the Medvyezhi Islands. 

In 1712, Permyakov and his companion Merkury Vagin crossed Yana Bay from the mouth of the Yana River to Bolshoy Lyakhovsky over the ice and explored the then-unknown island. 
Permyakov and Vagin were murdered on the way back from their exploration by mutineering expedition members. The Cossacks took Permyakov's dead body down to the ice and set it on fire. No one knows what the rebellious Cossacks did with the ashes, but Yakov Permyakov's remains were never found.

References

1712 deaths
Russian murder victims
Russian explorers
Explorers of Asia
Explorers of the Arctic
New Siberian Islands
Laptev Sea
East Siberian Sea
Year of birth unknown
Russian merchants
Male murder victims
18th-century businesspeople from the Russian Empire